The official Flag of Mayotte is the Flag of France. The Coat of arms of Mayotte is well defined and was adopted by the predecessor entity of the Department of Mayotte in 1982.

Flag 

Mayotte is an overseas region and department of France. The French flag is thus the official flag accordingly to the second article of the constitution.

A banner is flown by the departmental council, consisting of the department's coat of arms on a white field with the words "DEPARTMENT DE MAYOTTE".

Coat of arms 

The coat of arms of Mayotte were created by Reunion Archives former director Michel Chabin and drawn by Pascale Santerre. The proposal was adopted by the former General Council of Mayotte on 23 July 1982 and assumed by the new department in 2011.

The blue and the red come from the Flag of France, with the addition of a yellow shade for the two ylang-ylang flowers. The department's graphic charter gives the following color codes for the coat of arms:

The escutcheon, supported by two seahorses, reads as follows: Per fess azure a crescent argent and gules two ylang-ylang flowers or; within a bordure engrelled argent. The coat of arms also displays Mayotte motto, Ra Hachiri, translated from Shimaore as "We are vigilant". Finally, the whole is enframed at the top by Département and at the bottom by de Mayotte, with de written vertically. The font used is Barmeno Bold.

In addition to the main version, colored, there are also two others: one in shades of grey and the other in black and white, to be used if technical constraints arose. The graphical charter imposes a 100% black and 100% white shades for the latter and the following color codes for the former:

Seal
The Departmental Council of Mayotte uses a seal based on the Great Seal of France.

See also
 Flag of Réunion
 Coat of arms of Réunion

References

External links 

 

Flags of Overseas France
Flag
Mayotte
Mayotte
Mayotte